Songs from Venice Beach is a compilation album by the American musician Ted Hawkins, released in 1995. It was the first collection of Hawkins's songs to be released after his death.

Production
The album's songs were recorded in 1985 but released a decade later, after Hawkins's death. The sessions took place in Nashville, and were financed by H. Thorp Minister III; Minister had asked to record Hawkins after hearing him at Venice Beach. For years, Hawkins sold tapes of the recordings at his concerts. Albums of the recordings were also sold in Europe.

Songs from Venice Beach consists of 13 cover songs, with only one Hawkins original, "Ladder of Success".

Critical reception

The Edmonton Journal thought that "the material is almost beside the point because this is as gritty and soulful as blues roots music gets." The Calgary Herald declared that "the supreme soulfulness of Hawkins versions of everything from 'There Stands The Glass' and Cooke's 'Good Times' to Curtis Mayfield's 'Gypsy Woman' and Brook Benton's 'I Got What I Wanted' will bring tears of joy to your eyes." The Columbus Dispatch deemed the album "a profoundly graceful and moving collection." The Press-Enterprise opined that the compilation "captures the singer's astonishing gifts—think Sam Cooke at his fiercest—as well as anything he's ever done."

AllMusic wrote that Hawkins combined "every form of roots music imaginable into his own singular soulful stew."

Track listing

References

Ted Hawkins albums
1995 compilation albums